Ian Single (born 7 April 1947) is a British fencer. He competed in the team foil event at the 1972 Summer Olympics.

References

1947 births
Living people
British male fencers
Olympic fencers of Great Britain
Fencers at the 1972 Summer Olympics